Nikolayevka is a rural locality (a selo) and the administrative center of Nikolayevsky Selsoviet of Ivanovsky District, Amur Oblast, Russia. The population was 287 as of 2018. There are five streets.

Geography 
Nikolayevka is located on the left bank of the Belaya River, 49 km northeast of Ivanovka (the district's administrative centre) by road. Novopokrovka is the nearest rural locality.

References 

Rural localities in Ivanovsky District, Amur Oblast